Krieger (German, 'warrior') is a surname. Notable people with the surname include:

People
 Adam Krieger (1634–1666), German Baroque composer
 Albert Krieger (1923–2020), American attorney
 Ali Krieger, American soccer player
 Andreas Krieger (born 1966), German athlete
 Andreas Frederik Krieger (1817–1893), Danish politician
 Byron Krieger (1920–2015), American Olympic fencer
 Cornell Krieger, American soccer player
 Earl Krieger (1896–1960), American college sports coach
 Eduard Krieger (1946–2019), Austrian footballer
 Eduardo Krieger (born 1928), Brazilian physician
 Gerhard Johannes Krieger, German engineer
 Hans Krieger (born 1933), German writer
 Harold G. Krieger (1926–1995), American politician and judge
 Helmut Krieger (born 1958), Polish shot putter
 Henry Krieger (born 1945), American composer
 Holly Krieger, American mathematician
 Johan Cornelius Krieger (1683–1755), Danish architect
 Johann Krieger (1651–1735), German Baroque composer and brother to Johann Philipp
 Johann Nepomuk Krieger (1865–1902), Bavarian selenographer
 Johann Philipp Krieger (1649–1725), German Baroque composer
 Joseph Krieger (born 1986), Australian-rules footballer
 Kurt Krieger (1926–1970), Austrian-American baseball player
 Leonard Krieger (1918-1990), American historian
 Louis Charles Christopher Krieger (1873–1940) American mycologist and illustrator
 Martin Harvey Krieger (born 1944), American physicist and professor of urban planning and public policy
 Mike Krieger (born 1986), Brazilian-American entrepreneur and Instagram co-founder
 Murray Krieger (1923–2000), American literary critic
 Pascal Krieger (born 1945), Swiss martial artist
 Robby Krieger (born 1946), American guitarist
 Solly Krieger (1909–1964), American boxer
 Tyler Krieger (born 1994), American baseball player
 Ulrich Krieger (born 1962), German musician
 Wolfgang Krieger (born 1940), German mathematician

Fictional characters
 Artix von Krieger, a character from multiple Artix Entertainment video games.
 Courtney A. Krieger, a character from G.I. Joe: A Real American Hero
 Dr. Algernop Krieger, head of the ISIS applied research department in Archer (TV series)

Swiss-language surnames
German-language surnames
Swiss-German surnames
Surnames from nicknames